The Ministry of Posts, Telecommunications and Information Technology is a Bangladeshi government ministry. It contains two divisions:
Posts and Telecommunications Division
Information and Communication Technology Division
It was formed on 10 February 2014, following the general election in January 2014.

History
Following the 2001 general election, the Ministry of Science and Technology (Bangladesh) was renamed on 18 September 2002 to become the Ministry of Science and Information & Communication Technology. To give more thrust for ICT sector the Information & Communication Technology Division was separated from Science and Technology ministry and it has upgraded as Ministry of Information & Communication Technology on 4 December 2011. The change is the evidence of understanding of the importance of ICT from the highest policy level and also an indication that the government is keen to keep pace with modern changing world. After 2014 election  Ministry of Posts and Telecommunications and Ministry of ICT are integrated to Ministry of Posts, Telecommunications and Information Technology.

Operational functions
The Administrative Arrangements Order made on 14 September 2015 detailed the following responsibilities to the ministry:
 Broadband policy and programs
 Postal and telecommunications policies and programs
 Spectrum policy management
 National policy issues relating to the digital economy
 Content policy relating to the information economy

Posts and Telecommunications Division
Organization of Posts and Telecommunications Division
Bangladesh Telecommunication Regulatory Commission
Bangladesh Post Office
Bangladesh Telecommunications Company Ltd
Bangladesh Submarine Cable Company Limited
Teletalk Bangladesh Ltd
Telephone Shilpa Sangstha
Bangladesh Cable Shilpa Limited
 Directorates of Telephones

Information and Communication Technology Division
Organization of Information and Communication Technology Division
Bangladesh Hi-Tech Park
ICT Directorate
Bangladesh Computer Council
Controller of Certifying Authority

References

External links 
 Posts and Telecommunications Division 
 Information and Communication Technology Division

 
Posts, Telecommunications and Information Technology
Communications ministries
Communications in Bangladesh